Tope Kolade Fasua  (born 11 September 1971) is a Nigerian businessman, economist, writer and 2019 Nigeria Presidential candidate for Abundant Nigeria Renewal Party (ANRP. He is the founder and CEO of Global Analytics Consulting Limited, an international consulting firm with its headquarters in Abuja, Nigeria. As a political reformer, he founded the Abundant Nigeria Renewal Party (ANRP) and got elected since February 2018, to serve as the National Chairman of the Party.
Fasua has authored numerous columns on newspapers and six books.

Early life and education 
Fasua was born and raised in Lagos. For his secondary school education, he attended Army Comprehensive High School in his hometown Akure in 1985 before he went further to study economics in Ondo State University, where he successfully graduated and received award for the best overall result in the department, faculty and entire school in 1991. In 1996, Fasua became a qualified accountant after attending the Institute of Chartered Accountants of Nigeria to obtain ACA(Associate Chartered Accountant). In between Fasua's movement from his long banking practice into starting his Consulting Firm, he attended London Metropolitan University to gain master's degree in Financial Markets and Derivatives in which he got Distinction in 2006. Harvard Business School, University of Groningen, Lonestar Academy, Texas are some the academic institutions where Fasua has attended for executive programs. Currently, he is a fellow Academic with his Ph.D in Public Policy and Administration, in view at Walden University.

Career

Banking 
After completing his bachelor's degree (Bsc. Economics 1991), Fasua started as a trainee banking officer in the Operations' Unit at Citizens Bank Limited, Victoria Island Lagos, he however spent over four years there before moving on to Standard Trust Bank Limited where he served as a manager. He also worked  at Equatorial Trust Bank Limited where at first, he acted as the senior manager before he was promoted to the rank of the Regional Director in Abuja from 2001 to 2005.

Business 
As a businessman, he started his Consulting firm, Global Analytics Consulting Limited, serving as the group CEO from September 2006 till date.

Writing 
Fasua being a prolific writer has authored fours books: Crushed, Things to Do Before Your Career Disappears, The Race for Capital, and A Change Will Come. Also featuring as a Policy and Public Affairs Analyst, he has been consistent in contributing articles on global and national economic matters, he is renowned columnist on various leading Nigerian Newspapers, and keeps featuring as an analyst on various TV and Radio programs.

At one point, he claimed to have written over 1000 articles.

Politics 

On 16 December 2016, Tope Fasua led a group of Nigerians to form a political party, Abundant Nigeria Renewal Party (ANRP), and on 14 December 2017, the party was finally announced a registered political party by INEC. ANRP, under him has grown its membership base to about 53000, as reported on the website on 12 July 2018. He was a panelist at 2019 MACAA conference.

Presidential Campaign 
At the ANRP National Executive Committee Meeting on 17 May 2018, Tope Fasua announced his intention to join the race, to seek nomination to run for Presidency in the forthcoming 2019 General Elections.

Bibliography

See also 
 Kingsley Moghalu
 Abundant Nigeria Renewal Party

References

External links

Living people
1971 births
Nigerian businesspeople
Nigerian economists
Nigerian business writers
People from Lagos
Adekunle Ajasin University alumni
Yoruba bankers
Alumni of London Metropolitan University
Harvard Business School alumni
21st-century Nigerian politicians
Yoruba politicians
Yoruba writers
Candidates for President of Nigeria
Nigerian bankers
Residents of Lagos